Snow White is a Disney media franchise that began in 1937 with the theatrical release of Snow White and the Seven Dwarfs. It is based on the 1812 fairy tale by the Brothers Grimm.

Feature films

Snow White and the Seven Dwarfs (1937)

Snow White and the Seven Dwarfs is a 1937 American animated film produced by Walt Disney Productions and released by RKO Radio Pictures. Based on the German fairy tale by the Brothers Grimm, it is the first full-length cel animated feature film and the 1st Disney animated feature film. In 1989, Snow White and the Seven Dwarfs was selected for preservation in the National Film Registry by the Library of Congress for being "culturally, historically, or aesthetically significant".

Snow White (2024)

In late October 2016, a live-action remake of Snow White and the Seven Dwarfs was announced, with Erin Cressida Wilson writing the script and Marc Platt producing. The remake expands upon the story of the 1937 film, and includes new songs written by Benj Pasek and Justin Paul. By September 2019, Marc Webb signed on to direct the film. In June 2021, Rachel Zegler was cast as Snow White and it was also reported that production would begin in 2022. The film is scheduled for release on March 22, 2024.

Comics
A comic strip adaptation of Disney's Snow White and the Seven Dwarfs was released to coincide with the release of the film. The comic strip was written by Merril de Marris and drawn by Hank Porter, both staff at Walt Disney Pictures.

The original strip ran on Sundays from December 12, 1937 to April 24, 1938 and was distributed by King Features Syndicate. The sequence ran in Disney's Silly Symphony slot, as a Sunday topper for Mickey Mouse.

The strip used a number of story ideas that were ultimately abandoned in the film, including a more elaborate and comical meeting between the Prince and Snow White (in which Snow White creates a "dummy" of her dream prince, which the real Prince sneaks into), and an entire storyline in which the Evil Queen kidnaps the Prince to prevent him from saving Snow White. Both of these abandoned concepts were notably recycled for use in Sleeping Beauty.

The comic was packaged and released as a comic book in 1938, 1944, 1951, 1987 and 1995 by Whitman Comics, Dell, Gold Key, Gladstone and Marvel.

Mondadori, the Italian publisher of Disney comics, produced various stories in comic book format featuring characters from Snow White and the Seven Dwarfs for Italian (and eventually European) consumption: the first such story, originally serialized in 1939 in the weekly magazine Paperino e altre avventure, was Biancaneve e il mago Basilisco (Snow White and Basilisk the Wizard) by Federico Pedrocchi (script) and Nino Pagot (art), a direct sequel to the American comic strip adaptation where Snow White's infant son is kidnapped by an evil wizard and rescued by the Seven Dwarfs. The following year, Pedrocchi and Pagot produced another story starring the Seven Dwarfs. Several other Italian stories, often with scripts by Guido Martina and art by Romano Scarpa or Luciano Bottaro, were published in the 1950s and 1960s.

Direct-to-video and television films

Mickey's Magical Christmas: Snowed in at the House of Mouse

Mickey's Magical Christmas: Snowed in at the House of Mouse, a direct-to-video spin-off film of Disney's House of Mouse, featured cameo appearances of the Snow White characters.

Once Upon a Halloween

The Evil Queen appeared in a starring role in the film Once Upon a Halloween, a 2005 direct-to-video film in DVD made by Walt Disney Home Entertainment of Walt Disney Pictures, featuring  the Evil Queen (from Snow White and the Seven Dwarfs) and Disney Villains. The film features clips from Disney movies plus shorts and songs.

Descendants

Descendants is a live-action Disney Channel Original movie based on the lives of the children of various Disney heroes and villains when they attend the same prep school. Evil Queen appears as one of the main antagonists of the film. Snow White also makes a minor appearance as a television reporter. The film also includes Evil Queen's daughter, Evie, and Dopey's son, Doug.

Television series

House of Mouse

Disney's animated television series House of Mouse included many Disney animated character cameos such as the Snow White characters.

Once Upon a Time

Fantasy television series Once Upon a Time regularly include live-action interpretations of characters including Snow White, the Evil Queen, the Huntsman, the Prince, the Mirror, and Grumpy (including the other dwarves as smaller characters).

Sofia the First

Snow White appeared in the 27th episode of the American animated television series Sofia the First, "The Enchanted Feast". The series features characters from the Disney Princess franchise.

The 7D

The 7D is a Disney animated series centering on the Seven Dwarfs from Snow White and the Seven Dwarfs. The series premiered on July 7, 2014 on Disney XD.

Short films
The Seven Dwarfs made rare appearances in shorts, despite their popularity; they simply were too numerous to animate efficiently. They appeared in the shorts The Standard Parade (1939), The Seven Wise Dwarfs (1941, using mostly recycled footage), All Together (1942) and The Winged Scourge (1943).

Theme park attractions

Snow White's Enchanted Wish

Snow White's Enchanted Wish is a popular theme park ride at Disneyland (an opening day attraction dating from 1955), Tokyo Disneyland, Disneyland Paris, and, formerly, Magic Kingdom at Walt Disney World.

Seven Dwarfs Mine Train

The Seven Dwarfs Mine Train roller coaster opened in 2013 as part of the New Fantasyland expansion at Magic Kingdom. Snow White, her Prince, the Queen (both in the form of a regent and a hag), and the Seven Dwarfs are also featured in parades and character appearances throughout the parks.

Snow White Grotto

Snow White Grotto is an attraction at Disneyland in Anaheim, California, Tokyo Disneyland at the Tokyo Disney Resort in Japan and at Hong Kong Disneyland. It is a wishing well located at the west of the Sleeping Beauty Castle (for Disneyland and Hong Kong Disneyland) or Cinderella Castle (for Tokyo Disneyland).

Snow White: An Enchanting Musical
Disneyland's Fantasyland Theater hosted Snow White: An Enchanting Musical from 2004 to 2006.

Broadway musical

Snow White and the Seven Dwarfs

The Disney-produced Snow White and the Seven Dwarfs (also known as Snow White Live!) played at Radio City Music Hall. Music and lyrics for four new songs were created by Jay Blackton and Joe Cook, respectively; titles included "Welcome to the Kingdom of Once Upon a Time" and "Will I Ever See Her Again?". It ran from October 18 to November 18, 1979 and January 11 to March 9, 1980, a total of 106 performances.

Video games

Snow White and the Seven Dwarfs (Atari)
The first attempt at a Snow White and the Seven Dwarfs video game was for the Atari 2600 as part of their line of children's games. It was never officially released, although an unfinished prototype was released as a reproduction cartridge for collectors at the 2002 Classic Gaming Expo, complete with cover art based on Atari's Disney video games of the era.

Walt Disney's Snow White and the Seven Dwarfs
Snow White and the Seven Dwarfs was released for the Game Boy Color system in 2001.

Kingdom Hearts series

Snow White also makes an appearance in the PlayStation 2 game Kingdom Hearts as one of the seven fabled Princesses of Heart. A world based on the movie, Dwarf Woodlands, appears in Kingdom Hearts: Birth by Sleep for the PlayStation Portable.

Snow White: Queen's Return
Snow White: Queen's Return (also known as Seven Dwarfs: The Queen's Return) is a 2013 free-to-play mobile game. A non-canonical continuation of the film, the Queen has survived the fall at the climax of the film and then reverted to her youthful form to cast a curse on Snow White, the dwarfs and their entire forest. The game was discontinued a year after its release.

Disney Magic Kingdom
During a limited time Event focused on Snow White and the Seven Dwarfs, the world builder game Disney Magic Kingdoms introduced Snow White, all the Seven Dwarfs and the Queen as playable characters, as well as attractions such as Magic Mirror on the Wall (featuring Magic Mirror as a non-player character), Seven Dwarfs' Cottage (featuring a blue bird and a raccoon as non-player characters), Seven Dwarfs Mine Train, and Snow White's Scary Adventures. Prince Charming was also included as a playable character in a later update of the game. In the game the characters are involved in new storylines that serve as a continuation of the events in the film.

Music

Snow White and the Seven Dwarfs

Snow White and the Seven Dwarfs, the soundtrack to the 1937 Walt Disney film, was the first commercially issued film soundtrack. It was released in January 1938 as Songs from Walt Disney's Snow White and the Seven Dwarfs (with the Same Characters and Sound Effects as in the Film of That Title) and has since seen numerous expansions and reissues.

References

 
Walt Disney Studios (division) franchises